Enosis Neon Parekklisia Football Club is a football club based in Parekklisia, Limassol, Cyprus and competes in Cypriot Second Division.

History
The club was founded in 2006 playing in black and yellow and is the theoretical continuation of AMEP Parekklisia and ATE-PEK Parekklisias. The team initially struggled in the fourth division but won promotion to the third division, winning the championship for the season 2009–10. In the 2014–2015 season the club was playing in the second division but was relegated after one season.

Titles
Cypriot Fourth Division (1): 2010

Notes

External links
 Official website

Football clubs in Cyprus
Association football clubs established in 2006
2006 establishments in Cyprus